Running in Traffic is a dramatic Scottish feature film. The story follows the lives of two central characters, Joe Cullen, played by Bryan Larkin and Kayla Golebiowski, Anna Kerth, as they try to rebuild their lives after each two unrelated tragedies. The central plot centers on how two strangers lives can impact one another. The film also stars Kenneth Cranham in the role of Bill Cullen; Cullen's uncle. It was first screened at the Edinburgh International Film Festival in 2009. It was directed by Dale Corlett and written by Bryan Larkin.

The film won numerous awards including the Apollo Award for Excellence in Norway and the BAFTA Scotland New Talent Award in 2009 for Producing. It was also nominated in both the Acting and Directing categories.

External links

2009 films
British romantic drama films
English-language Scottish films
Films shot in Scotland
2009 romantic drama films
2009 in Scotland
Scottish films
2000s English-language films
2000s British films